Azja Express (formerly known also as Ameryka Express) is the Polish TV version of the reality show Peking Express. It was created by Ludo Poppe. It has been broadcast on TVN since 2016. The show aims at demonstrating how various couples deal with the challenges and pitfalls of attempting a long-distance hitchhike to a strange city, together with all the difficulties presented by trying to communicate in a language they don't understand.

Series overview

Travel

Season I

Season II

Season IV

Season I 
  

 Immunity in the next episode
 Elimination
 Amulet
 Minus one place (Black flag)
 Couple with amulet from eliminated couple
 The couple voluntarily left the show.
 Minus one place and elimination

  In episode 6 contestants raced in mixed-up pairs - one person was a "speeder" and the other one was a "blocker".

Ratings

Season II 
  

 Immunity in the next episode
 Elimination
 Amulet
 Couple with amulet from eliminated couple
 The couple lost money
 Minus one place and elimination

  Stanisław & Marta with their partners got eliminated in episodes 4 & 6, but were brought back to the competition in episode 7 as one couple.
  In episode 8 contestants raced in mixed-up pairs - one person was a "speeder" and the other one was a "blocker".
  In episode 10 couples were separated - one person was racing and the other one was trying to help them by doing challenges.

Season III 
  

 Immunity in the next episode
 Elimination
 Amulet
 Lost money
 Couple with amulet from eliminated couple
 The couple lost money
 Plus one place

  Magda & Katarzyna with their partners got eliminated in episodes 2 & 4, but were brought back to the competition in episode 5 as one couple.
  In episode 9 contestants raced in mixed-up pairs - one person was a "speeder" and the other one was a "blocker".

Ratings

Season IV

Ratings

References

External links

Hitchhiking
Polish reality television series